Pulaski County is a county located  in the U.S. state of Illinois. According to the 2020 census, it had a population of 5,193. Its county seat is Mound City. Its largest city is Mounds. It is located along the Ohio River in the southwestern portion of the state, known locally as "Little Egypt".

History
Pulaski County was formed on March 3, 1843, out of parts of Alexander and Johnson counties. It was named in honor of Casimir Pułaski who was killed at the Siege of Savannah in the Revolutionary War.

Geography
It is the third-smallest county in Illinois by area.

Climate and weather

Major highways
  Interstate 57, which has been listed as a speed trap.
  U.S. Highway 51
  Illinois Route 37
  Illinois Route 169

Adjacent counties
 Union County (north)
 Johnson County (northeast)
 Massac County (east)
 Ballard County, Kentucky (southeast)
 Alexander County (west)

National protected area
 Cypress Creek National Wildlife Refuge (part)

Demographics

As of the 2010 census, there were 6,161 people, 2,642 households, and 1,658 families living in the county. The racial makeup of the county was 64.4% white, 32.4% black or African American, 0.4% American Indian, 0.2% Asian, 0.7% from other races, and 1.9% from two or more races. Those of Hispanic or Latino origin made up 1.6% of the population. In terms of ancestry, 15.1% were German, 6.8% were Irish, 6.6% were English, and 6.6% were American.

Of the 2,642 households, 27.3% had children under the age of 18 living with them, 43.6% were married couples living together, 14.3% had a female householder with no husband present, 37.2% were non-families, and 33.4% of all households were made up of individuals. The average household size was 2.32 and the average family size was 2.96. The median age was 43.2 years.

The median income for a household in the county was $31,173 and the median income for a family was $39,699. Males had a median income of $36,915 versus $29,007 for females. The per capita income for the county was $18,444. About 16.7% of families and 22.7% of the population were below the poverty line, including 32.0% of those under age 18 and 18.0% of those age 65 or over.

Communities

Cities
 Mound City
 Mounds

Villages
 Karnak
 New Grand Chain (usually referred to as "Grand Chain")
 Olmsted
 Pulaski
 Ullin

Unincorporated communities

 America
 Perks
 Spencer Heights
 Villa Ridge
 Wetaug

Politics
Pulaski County was often a swing county at the presidential level, but has voted for the Republican candidates for U.S. president since 2012.

This trend in Pulaski County has begun to affect down-ballot races as well. In the 2020 Senate election, longtime Democratic Senator Dick Durbin lost the county for the first time in his career, after winning it in his four prior elections.

See also
 National Register of Historic Places listings in Pulaski County

Notes

References
 

 
1843 establishments in Illinois
Illinois counties
Illinois counties on the Ohio River
Southern Illinois
Populated places established in 1843